Brezičani may refer to:
 Brezičani, Čelinac
 Brezičani, Donji Vakuf